Dr Dame Rosemary Rue, DBE, FRCP, FFPHM, FRCPsych, FRCGP FRCS (14 June 1928 – 24 December 2004) was a British physician and civil servant, most notable as the one-time regional general manager/medical officer of the Oxford Regional Health Authority.

She was also:
 President of the Medical Women's Federation (1982–1983)
 President of the Faculty of Community Medicine of the Royal College of Physicians (1986–1989) 
 President of the British Medical Association (1990–1991)
 Founding Fellow of Green College, Oxford
 Awarded the Edward Jenner Medal of the Royal Society of Medicine (2001)

Background
Elsie Rosemary Laurence was born in 1928 in Hutton, Essex in England and moved with her family to London in 1933. She was evacuated in 1940 during The Blitz to stay with relatives in Devonshire, where she contracted tuberculosis and peritonitis. It was while she was convalescing that she decided on a career in medicine, entering the all-woman Royal Free Medical School in London in 1945.

In 1950 she married Roger Rue, a pilot instructor of Belgian descent in the Royal Air Force. When she told the medical school dean that she was changing her name, she was told that she could not stay at the school if she was married. She was instead accepted at the University of Oxford, qualifying in 1951 after taking the University of London exams.

Her first job was at an extended-care hospital in Oxford. She did not tell her employers that she had a husband or a newborn son, as many hospitals then didn't employ married women. She was eventually sacked when her employers learned she was married with children. In 1954, she contracted polio from a patient, becoming the last person in Oxford to get it.

Polio gave her the major, lifelong disability of having one bad leg. This left her unable to walk, even with crutches, or perform basic tasks such as carrying a medical bag. She spent time teaching at girls' schools. Unable to walk up front steps for interviews, she had to turn down several medical jobs.

New hospitals were constructed in Swindon, Reading and Milton Keynes, with basic modules that could be incorporated into every hospital. In 1960, she was named Assistant County Medical Officer for Hertfordshire and worked as a part-time paediatrician in Watford. She spent an academic term at the Institute of Child Health in London. In 1965, she was offered the job of Senior Assistant Medical Officer for the Oxford region, running that region's health authority. In the early 1960s new money was allocated by the government to rebuild the crumbling medical system in the UK. Dr Rue ensured that Oxford got a fair share.

Later positions

In 1972 she became one of the founders of the Faculty of Community Health (now the Faculty of Public Health),  which brought together academic bodies such as the London School of Hygiene and Tropical Medicine, community health doctors, and organisations such as the Public Health Laboratory Service (PHLS). She served as the PHLS Regional Medical Officer from 1973 to 1984, and Regional General Manager from 1984 to 1988.

She became Dame of the British Empire in 1989.

Death
In her last few years, Dame Rosemary continued to take an active interest in health service matters, despite both breast and colon cancer. She died, aged 76, at her cottage in Stanton St John, Oxfordshire on Christmas Eve 2004, aged 76. She was survived by her two sons.

References

External links
 
 British Medical Journal obituary for Dr Dame Rosemary Rue
 Oxford Medical Files obituary for Dr Dame Rosemary Rue
Watch a video oral history interview with Dr Dame Rosemary Rue - recorded by Oxford Brookes University in partnership with the Royal College of Physicians as part of the Medical Sciences Video Archive.

1928 births
2004 deaths
People from Hutton, Essex
Medical doctors from London
Alumni of the UCL Medical School
Alumni of the University of London
Alumni of the University of Oxford
English women medical doctors
Fellows of Green Templeton College, Oxford
Fellows of the Royal College of Physicians
Fellows of the Royal College of Surgeons
Fellows of the Royal College of Psychiatrists
Fellows of the Royal College of General Practitioners
20th-century English medical doctors
Deaths from cancer in England
Deaths from breast cancer
Deaths from colorectal cancer
Dames Commander of the Order of the British Empire
Administrators in the National Health Service
Presidents of the Medical Women's Federation
20th-century women physicians
20th-century English women
20th-century English people